Marko Nešić (born 5 November 1976) is a Serbian conductor, composer, Assistant Professor – Docent of Orchestration and (since September 2010) Vice Dean at the Faculty of Arts of Priština-Zvečan and teacher at the Grand School of Music "dr Miloje Milojević", Kragujevac.

Education

He was born in Pančevo, SR Serbia, SFR Yugoslavia and graduated from the Faculty of Music in Belgrade in the class of Professor Jovan Šajnović- who was a follower of famous conducting school from Germany (Otto Klemperer was professor of Friedrich Zaun, and Professor Zaun was teacher of Professor Šajnović).

Teaching career

He taught Conducting, Playing Choral Partitures, led Mixed Youth Choir "Kir Stefan Srbin" and String Orchestra from High Music School of Kragujevac. Since 2009 he has been teaching Orchestration at the University of Priština Faculty of Arts.

Affiliations

Mr. Nešić is the President of Young Monarchist Club (Serbian: Klub mladih monarhista); he was the President of Rotaract Club of Kragujevac; member of Europa Cantat (Germany) and Conductors Guild (United States).

References

Academic staff of the University of Pristina
1976 births
Living people
University of Arts in Belgrade alumni
Serbian composers
Serbian conductors (music)
21st-century conductors (music)